The Solid State Phased Array Radar System (SSPARS, colloquially "BMEWS radar network'" as late as 2004) is a United States Space Force radar, computer, and communications system for missile warning and space surveillance "at five (5) geographically separated units worldwide including Beale Air Force Base, CA, Cape Cod Space Force Station, MA, Clear Space Force Station, AK, RAF Fylingdales, UK, and Thule Airbase, Greenland."  SSPARS completed replacement of the RCA 474L Ballistic Missile Early Warning System when the last SSPAR (phased array radar with 2500 "solid state transmitter" modules) was operational at Clear in 2001, the year SSPARS equipment included:

 Raytheon AN/FPS-123 PAVE PAWS Radar at Beale (FPS-115 IOC April 4, 1980) and Cape Cod (FPS-115 IOC August 15, 1980) 
 Raytheon AN/FPS-120 Solid State Phased Array Radar at Thule ("2QFY87") with greater radar capabilities than the FPS-115 PAVE PAWS radars
 Raytheon AN/FPS-126 Solid State Phased Array Radar at Fylingdales with three faces for 360 degree coverage (constructed August 1989-October 1992)
Raytheon AN/FPS-120 Solid State Phased Array Radar using an older antenna from the 1987 PAVE PAWS EWR in Texas (groundbreaking April 16, 1998, for the "Clear Radar Upgrade")

After the Fylingdales BMEWS radars had been replaced by Raytheon/Cossor AeroSpace and Control Data Corporation (embedded CDC-Cyber computer) at a cost of US $100M, in February 1995 the "missile warning center at Cheyenne Mountain AS [was] undergoing a $450 million upgrade program".  The entire SSPARS became operational on January 31, 2001 when the "SSPARS Site" at Clear AFS (separate from the BMEWS site) had Initial Operational Capability.  The Clear AN/FPS-120 was subsequently "upgraded to the AN/FPS-123 model" SSPA Radar, and the SSPARS was modified in the Early Warning Radar Service Life Extension Program  The US approved sale of an AN/FPS-115 to Taiwan in 2000 and it was introduced in 2006.

AN/FPS-132 Upgraded Early Warning Radar
The AN/FPS-132 Upgraded Early Warning Radar (UEWR) is a series of phased array radar systems used for long-range early warning and space surveillance, operating as part of the United States Missile Defense and Space Surveillance Network.

History
The Solid State Phased Array Radar System began replacing PAVE PAWS when the first AN/FPS-115 face was taken off-line for the radar upgrade.  New AN/FPS-123 Early Warning Radars became operational in (Beale) and (Cape Cod) in each base's existing PAVE PAWS "Scanner Building".

The UK and Alaska BMEWS stations became SSPARS radar stations when their respective AN/FPS-126 radar  and 2001 AN/FPS-120 became operational.  In 2007, 100 owners/trustees of amateur radio repeaters near AN/FPS-123 radars were notified to lower their power output to mitigate interference, and AN/FPS-123s were part of the Air Force Space Surveillance System by 2009.  BAE Systems began a 2007 contract for SSPARS maintenance.  The SSPARS radar electronics was subsequently upgraded, e.g., the Beale radar and the Fylingales FPS-126 each became an AN/FPS-132 Upgraded Early Warning Radar (UEWR) by Raytheon. The Beale AN/FPS-123 was upgraded to a Raytheon AN/FPS-132 (UEWR) with capabilities to operate in the Ground-based Midcourse Defense (GMD) ABM system—the Beale UEWR included "Avionics", "T/R modules", "FEX/TTG", "BSG", "Signal Processor", and other changes.  After additional UEWR installations for GMD at Thule Site J and the UK (contracted 2003), a 2012 ESD/XRX Request for Information for replacement, and remote operation, of the remaining "PAVE PAWS/BMEWS/PARCS systems" at Cape Cod, Alaska, and North Dakota was issued. The Alaska AN/FPS-132 was contracted in fall 2012 and the Cape Cod installation in 2013.

System overview
 Solid-state phased array radar
 Each radar installation has multiple faces, where each face provides a 120-degree coverage.
 Operating frequency: Ultra high frequency (UHF)
 Range: 3,000 miles

Locations
Active:
 Beale Air Force Base, California
 RAF Fylingdales, United Kingdom
 Thule Site J (Thule Air Base), Greenland
Planned:
 Clear Space Force Station, Alaska
 Cape Cod Space Force Station, Massachusetts
 Qatar

References

1987 in military history
2001 in military history
Early warning systems
Cold War military computer systems of the United States
Equipment of the United States Space Force
Radar networks
United States Space Surveillance Network